The LG Watch Urbane is a smartwatch released by LG Corporation on April 27, 2015. There are gold and silver models, each with a 22mm-wide interchangeable strap. The watch has IP67 dust and water resistance. 

The  LG Watch Urbane was equipped with a Qualcomm Snapdragon 400 SoC, 512MB of LPDDR2 RAM, and 4GB of eMMC storage. The OLED display is a POLED variant, with an equivalent resolution to a square display of 320x320, with capacitive touch input.

The watch communicates with its companion Android phone or iPhone using Bluetooth v4.1LE, and has 2.4 GHz 802.11b/g/n WiFi for synchronizing Google Services data.

The watch has 9 axis movement sensors (gyro, accelerometer, compass), barometer, and heart rate sensor. The watch has a microphone which is used with Google Assistant's speech recognition. Unlike newer Wear devices it doesn't have a speaker, it can only vibrate for alerts.
The watch charges through contacts on its back, which connect via sprung "pogo" pins to a magnetically clamped puck, and the puck has a microUSB connector and thus requires an external power source.

References

External links

 
 LG News Room webpage

Android (operating system) devices
Wear OS devices
Products introduced in 2015
Smartwatches
LG Electronics products